Moses Malagu is a Nigerian Olympic boxer. He represented his country in the flyweight division at the 1992 Summer Olympics. He won his first bout against Paul Buttimer, and then lost his second bout to Raúl González.

References

1972 births
Living people
Nigerian male boxers
Olympic boxers of Nigeria
Boxers at the 1992 Summer Olympics
Flyweight boxers